The city of Ottawa, Canada held municipal elections on December 4, 1933.

Mayor of Ottawa

Ottawa Board of Control
(4 elected)

Ottawa City Council
(2 elected from each ward)

References
Ottawa Citizen, December 5, 1933

Municipal elections in Ottawa
1933 Ontario municipal elections
1930s in Ottawa
December 1933 events